Valérie Vogt (born 25 October 1962) is a French actress.

Filmography

Theater

References

External links
 

1962 births
Living people
Actors from Reims
French film actresses
French television actresses